Fabian Allen (born 7 May 1995) is a Jamaican cricketer. He made his first-class debut for Jamaica in the 2016–17 Regional Four Day Competition on 25 November 2016. Prior to his first-class debut, he was part of the West Indies squad for the 2014 Under-19 Cricket World Cup. He made his international debut for the West Indies in October 2018.

Domestic and T20 franchise career
In the last few games of the 2016-17 Regional Four Day Competition, he scored 50s in three consecutive matches. He was picked up in the 13th round of the 2017 CPL Draft by the St Kitts and Nevis Patriots. He made his Twenty20 debut for St Kitts and Nevis Patriots in the 2017 Caribbean Premier League on 19 August 2017.

In November 2017, he scored his maiden century in first-class cricket, making 169 not out for Jamaica against Trinidad and Tobago in the 2017–18 Regional Four Day Competition. He made his List A debut for Jamaica in the 2017–18 Regional Super50 on 6 February 2018.

In June 2018, he was named in the Cricket West Indies B Team squad for the inaugural edition of the Global T20 Canada tournament. In October 2018, he was named in the squad for the Sylhet Sixers team, following the draft for the 2018–19 Bangladesh Premier League. In July 2020, he was named in the St Kitts & Nevis Patriots squad for the 2020 Caribbean Premier League. However, on 6 August 2020, Allen was ruled out of the tournament after missing his flight.

In February 2021, Allen was bought by the Punjab Kings in the IPL auction ahead of the 2021 Indian Premier League. He made his IPL debut on 21 April 2021 against the Sunrisers Hyderabad, taking the only wicket of the Sunrisers' innings (David Warner), ending the match with the figures of 1-22 from his four overs.

In April 2021, he was signed by Peshawar Zalmi to play in the rescheduled matches in the 2021 Pakistan Super League. In February 2022, he was bought by the Mumbai Indians in the auction for the 2022 Indian Premier League tournament. In July 2022, he was signed by the Kandy Falcons for the third edition of the Lanka Premier League.

International career
In October 2018, he was named in the West Indies' One Day International (ODI) and Twenty20 International (T20I) squads for series against India. He made his ODI debut for the West Indies against India on 27 October 2018. He made his T20I debut for the West Indies against India on 4 November 2018.

In April 2019, he was named in the West Indies' squad for the 2019 Cricket World Cup. In July 2019, Cricket West Indies awarded him with a central contract for the first time, ahead of the 2019–20 season. In September 2021, Allen was named in the West Indies' squad for the 2021 ICC Men's T20 World Cup.

References

External links
 

1995 births
Living people
West Indies One Day International cricketers
West Indies Twenty20 International cricketers
Jamaican cricketers
Jamaica cricketers
St Kitts and Nevis Patriots cricketers
Sylhet Strikers cricketers
Multan Sultans cricketers
Cricketers from Kingston, Jamaica
Cricketers at the 2019 Cricket World Cup
Peshawar Zalmi cricketers
Punjab Kings cricketers
Mumbai Indians cricketers